The Maratha conquest of Northwest India occurred between 1757 and 1759, when the Maratha Empire captured the northwestern parts of the Indian subcontinent (in present-day Pakistan) from the Durrani Empire. It had long-lasting effects upon the future geopolitics of the Indian subcontinent.

Background 
After the death of Mughal Emperor Aurangzeb in 1707, the Maratha War of Independence ended in Maratha victory. This was followed by the phase of rapid expansion of the Maratha Empire into North India for the next 50 years under Peshwa Baji Rao I and his brother Chimanji Appa. They conquered Gujarat, the whole of Central India and Orissa, subdued Rajputana and raided into Bengal and Tiruchirapalli in Tamil Nadu, and imposed chauth upon these areas. Their ambition pushed them further northwards than Delhi into Haryana, which collided with the ambitions of Ahmad Shah Abdali, the founder of Durrani Empire. In 1757, Ahmad Shah Abdali raided Delhi and captured Punjab and Kashmir with the help of Rohilla chief Najib Khan. He installed his son Timur Shah Durrani in Multan and went back to Afghanistan.

The Campaign 

The Maratha Peshwa Balaji Baji Rao sent his brother Raghunath Rao along with Shamsher Bahadur, Ramsingha, Gangadhar Tatya, Sakharam Bapu Bokil, Naroshankar rajebahadur, Maujiram Bania and a large army towards Delhi. They were accompanied by Malhar Rao Holkar of Malwa who had a long experience of North India and its rulers. The Marathas captured Delhi in August 1757. They decisively defeated the Rohillas and Afghans near Delhi in 1758. The defeat was so decisive that Najib Khan surrendered to the Marathas and became their prisoner.

Initial campaign of Sirhind
In Punjab, Adina Beg Khan, along with the Sikhs, was already in revolt with Ahmad Shah Abdali who had invaded Punjab multiple times and had been repelled each time. He decided to call the Marathas for help as a large Afghan garrison was expected to reinvade and Adina needed more alliance to battle the invaders. On 7 March, Raghunathrao had encamped at Rajpura where he received Adina Beg Khan’s envoys, and was informed that the latter, accompanied by 15,000 Sikh fighters, belonging to the bands (the jathas) of Jassa Singh Ahluwalia and Baba Ala Singh of Patiala had closed upon Sirhind from the other side of Satluj. A concerted attack on the fort of Sirhind was made by the Marathas and the Sikhs on 8 March 1758. Ahmad Samad Khan, with his 10,000 Afghan troops, held out for about two weeks before his capitulation on 21 March. After the victory, the town was thoroughly sacked by the victors. After defeating the Afghan-Rohilla forces, the Marathas and Sikhs forced the Afghans into the Khyber Pass. 

The Maratha and Sikh forces then gave chase to the Pathans on horseback and were in quick pursuit of them in which they went on to capture Attock and then Peshawar from the Afghans.

Maratha general Bapuji Trimbak was given the charge of guarding Multan and Dera Ghazi Khan from the Afghans. Maratha rule in Multan was short-lived as Durrani re-captured the city in November 1759.

Adina Beg's sudden death threw Punjab into turmoil. Many of his soldiers, particularly Afghan mercenaries deserted his army camp and added to the number of freebooters, thus creating chaos and anarchy everywhere. Sikhs started again to revolt against Muslim ruling elite, which had caused Punjab to go into political and economic turmoil. Khawaja Mirza who was now the Maratha governor of Haryana-Delhi could not cope with the situation. He sent an express appeal to the Peshwa for reinforcements, alerted all the junior Maratha officers to help him restore law and order in the state and he also recalled Maratha detachments from Peshawar and Attock to safeguard his position in Karnal. Tukoji Holkar and Narsoji Pandit, the Maratha commanders of Peshawar and Attock had to withdraw their troops from the frontier posts. Sabaji Scindia was now given the charge of Peshawar.

Raghunathrao and his deputy Malhar Rao were not interested in holding the position in the north for long. On their request, Peshwa had to find their substitutes. He gave supreme command of Delhi to Dattaji Scindia, while Jankoji Scindia was appointed his deputy. They proceeded towards Delhi separately at different times.

A massive army of Marathas under their new commanders, Scindias reached Machhiwara in March 1759. Like Raghunathrao, Dattaji also didn't want to stay in Punjab for long.
As there was no news of Abdali's invasion, Dattaji deferred the appointment of any permanent governor in Punjab and left it to the Peshwa for decision at his convenience. After deliberations with his advisors, Dattaji deputed Sabaji to take care of Haryana and Nwfp, Peshawar and Attock along with assistance of Bapu Rao, Dadu Rao and Sena Pandit for time being and himself left Punjab for the suppression of Najib-ud-Daula in the Ganga valley. Bapu Rao took the charge of Rohtas Fort, while other officers were appointed on the frontier posts.

Taking advantage of Sabaji's absence from Peshawar post, the Afghans marched to Peshawar. The Peshawar fort was taken by Afghans with heavy losses to the besieged Maratha garrison. Thereafter the Afghan invaders, under Jahan Khan overran Attock and threatened the Rohtas Fort. By that time, Sabaji Scindia reached the place in the Battle of Lahore, (1759) with fresh troops and a large number of Sikh fighters, who had once again allied with the Marathas. The combined forces of the Marathas and Sikhs defeated the Afghan garrison in which Jahan Khan lost his son and was himself wounded. The Afghans quickly vacated the forts of Peshawar and Attock and retreated west to Afghanistan. So, Peshawar once again fell to Marathas.

Aftermath

Decline of Maratha power in North-West

It was unbearable for Abdali to overlook this defeat. The Rohilla chief Najib Khan invited Abdali to avenge his defeat. He, along with his commander Jahan Khan invaded Punjab for the fifth time with a massive force of 60,000 accompanied by heavy field-guns. Trimbak Rao, the Maratha governor of Multan, with his 6000 Maratha army, made a hasty retreat towards Lahore; Sabaji Patel also vacated Peshawar without a fight and was joined by Tukoji Holkar at Attock, fleeing towards Lahore. The remaining Marathas retreated straight to Delhi from their northernmost posts at Sonipat. Unlike Marathas, who made an ignominious exist from the Punjab, the Sikhs did not allow Abdali to take on Lahore without a fight where thousands of the Sikh fighters assembled  on the west Bank of Ravi to block the Afghans and fought a pitched battle against them, in which as many as 2000 Afghans were killed, fighting against the Sikhs, and the commander Jahan Khan was wounded. On 24 December 1759, a battle was fought between Dattaji and Abdali in which Dattaji's general Bhoite was defeated with a loss of 2500 Maratha soldiers after the Mughal contingent fled from the Maratha side. As a consequence of victory, Abdali managed to join forces with Najib-ud-Daula.

Qutub Shah, the preceptor and ally of Najib, killed Dattaji and cut his head off at Burrari Ghat near Delhi in January 1760. Abdali followed him. Peshwa Balaji Baji Rao sent his cousin Sadashivrao Bhau to repel Abdali which ultimately resulted in the Third Battle of Panipat where although Abdali won a Pyrrhic victory the material situation did not change on ground. Before going back to Afghanistan, Abdali sued for peace with Marathas blaming Najib and others for his entry in India and pointedly stating that he did not want any rivalry with the Marathas. Abdali re-instated Marathas as the "Protector of the Mughal Empire". Panipat war was a setback to the Maratha Empire in the North-west. After the Panipat war Maratha engaged with war with Sultan of Mysore Hyder Ali and Tipu Sultan both were defeated. Maratha also engaged with war with Nawab of Hyderabad and defeated Nawab of Hyderabad. Marathas also fought war with East India Company in 1785 and defeated East India Company. There was also a crisis in Maratha Leadership after sudden deaths of two successive Peshwa's. 

Within 10 years, Marathas were firmly in grasp of power in the north west under the leadership of Mahadji Shinde famously leading Capture of Delhi (1771).

Reasons for Decline
The Marathas had failed to befriend the important party of Punjab, particularly Sikhs, even though they had not entered Punjab, they had got close enough to be aided by Sikh troops in numerous battles. They couldn't make any formal treaty with Sikhs, who along with Adina Beg had assisted them in their conquest of north-west. According to an assessment, the Sikhs were ever ready to co-operate with the Marathas, but it goes to the discredit of the Marathas that they could not make a proper confederacy with Sikhs due to their minor stature as a confederacy. Sikhs regency was highly fluid until the Marathas arrived winning for them Sirhind and Lahore.

Marathas fought successful wars with both the Sultans of Mysore, namely Hyder Ali and Tipu Sultan, in which both were defeated. Maratha also fought many wars with the Nizam of Hyderabad and crushed his power. They also fought war with East India Company in 1775 and defeated them with great difficultly. They were also fighting against Portuguese near Thane and Surat, moreover their capital was Poona (now Pune) which was too far from Delhi to conduct immediate actions and war play. In brief, the Marathas didn't have peaceful time in their period of supremacy as they always had to face battles after battles in various parts of country, so they didn't get enough time to establish stable administration in regions which they had conquered in northwest India and Pakistan. They even decided to extend their rule up to Kabul and Kandahar but several Hindu kings feared that emergence of Maratha empire would hurt their territorial interests so they invited Abdali to invade India along with Muslim rulers

Finding the Maratha leadership completely off guard against their political foes, many Afghans who were earlier taken captives by Marathas quickly changed their loyalty towards Adina Beg and were recruited in his army. However, later on, they betrayed him and joined Abdali's forces during his fifth invasion.

The Peshwa was alarmed by the growing French and British influence in the Deccan. When Abdali invaded Punjab for the fifth time, the Marathas didn't try hard enough to save the frontier posts and instead started planning to save Delhi from another invasion.

See also
 Maratha Resurrection
 Capture of Delhi, 1771

References 

Military history of India
Conflicts in 1758

Invasions by India